The wanghong economy refers to the Chinese digital economy which is based on influencer marketing through social media platforms. Wanghong is the Chinese term for internet celebrity. Chinese wanghong celebrities attract the attention of internet users, which can translate into profit through e-commerce and online advertising.

According to CBN Data, a commercial data company affiliated with Alibaba, the Chinese internet celebrity economy was estimated to be worth ¥58 billion RMB (US$8.4 billion) in 2016, which is more than China's total movie box office revenue in 2015.

Business model

Online retailing 
Wanghong celebrities use social media platforms to sell their self-branded products to potential buyers among their followers via Chinese customer-to-customer C2C websites, such as Taobao. Celebrities model their business and promote their products by posting pictures or videos of themselves wearing the clothes or accessories they sell or giving makeup or fashion tips. Chinese e-commerce internet celebrities serve as key opinion leaders (KOLs) (known in the United States as "influencers") in online retailing. As influencers, wanghong can persuade their followers' fashion and lifestyle choices; to emulate wanghong, followers become loyal consumers. 

In this business model, consumers are essential in driving the products and helping brands thrive. Through social media, consumers can impact the success or failure of online stores, products, and brands.  These types of consumers are considered prosumers or "professional customers." New forms of consumption disentangle themselves little by little from rigid social stratification and end up being governed by fashion trends and experts who provide good taste and chic outfits.

Zhang Dayi (张大奕)—one of China's best-known wanghong according to BBC News, with 4.9 million followers on Sina Weibo—has an online shop on Taobao, reportedly earning ¥300 million RMB (US$46 million) per year, compared to US$21 million made by Fan Bingbing (范冰冰), a top Chinese actress. 

In 2015, Alibaba's Singles' Day sales reached a record of $14.3 billion, with most revenue coming from its online retail platform, Taobao; five of Taobao's top 10 best-performing shops belonged to wanghong.

Social media advertising 
The foundation of social media advertising is content and relates to the wanghong economy. Wanghong uses free, high-quality original information to attract netizens' attention and influence their habits. These internet celebrities have broken the monopoly of traditional media. They have thousands of followers and can influence purchasing behavior.

There are two ways to advertise the product by wanghong.

 Paying internet celebrities to advertise the products: When internet celebrities have enough followers, some companies may contact them for advertising. For example, in 2016, inserting an advertising video in Papi Jiang's (papi 酱) internet video program will cost the company 22 million yuan which is about 2.5 million pounds; moreover, some manufacturers will set up new brands for internet celebrities, and they will be the suppliers so that they can save the cost of marketing to sell the products to the fans of internet celebrities. For instance, Zhang Dayi (张大奕), a famous fashion internet celebrity on Sina Weibo, reports her brand's annual sales are over 1 million pounds.
 Shaping official social network pages to imitate an internet celebrity: For example, Bowu (博物) Magazine has 6.2 million followers, Gugong Taobao (故宫淘宝) has 670 thousand followers, and Haier has 580 thousand followers. The company network accounts will post advertisements, but also focus on attracting new followers. They will communicate with their followers and create topics to encourage them to discuss. An aforementioned example is Bowu Magazine, which is a natural and science magazine. To imitate an internet celebrity, the magazine identified species for netizens in a first-person perspective, and this behaviour attracted the attention of users. This method was a success, and the number of followers of Bowu Magazine increased dramatically from 800 thousand in January 2015 to 6.2 million in March 2017. At the same time, the circulation grew from tens of thousands to 220 thousand in 2015.

In addition, the styles of wanghong are more distinct, and their fans or followers are also. Thus, it is easy to differentiate the needs and characteristics of different groups. Then companies can choose those groups whose requirements match the products. To satisfy the needs of targeted customers, internet celebrities can enhance the accuracy of advertisements. It differs from traditional stars because the distance between internet celebrities and followers is shorter, so more followers can be converted into buyers.

Live advertising 

'Live+E-mall+Wanghong' is a new advertising mode in the wanghong economy. This advertising mode can create a platform for followers and audiences to communicate with Wanghong. The advertising can be integrated into the program's content like a placement, so the advertising is easier to be accepted by customers. For example, in 2016, Baicaowei (百草味), a snack company, compared with sales in the last year, increased five times sales during the 618 shopping festival because they cooperated with a famous wanghong called Shenman (沈曼) who is from YY, one of the largest live platforms in China.

Digital marketing 
The medium used by the internet celebrity is the Internet. Digital marketing is used in many aspects of the birth and development of a wanghong.

Companies use internet celebrities to attract people's attention or to create good content through their efforts to attract fans' attention. Internet celebrities have talents and skills involving beauty, fashion, food, life, humour, education, and music. They cover a fan base in different areas of interest who follow that wanghong's words and deeds. The commercial value of an internet celebrity has been recognized, and the commercial production of new Internet celebrities has appeared. There are professional internet Celebrity "packaging" companies to manage potential and current wanghong. These professional internet Celebrity companies can transform celebrities' fans into consumers for more benefits.

Today, internet celebrities are more like a brand or a production. Good marketing can make internet celebrities, and their company can run better and gain more revenue.

Digital marketing strategy  
An internet celebrity's digital marketing strategy can be divided into the following steps. In the birth phase of Internet celebrity, the marketing strategy first locations the internet celebrity. This location includes the characteristics of internet celebrities and the target audience. The next step is to increase awareness and influence. Internet celebrities should accumulate a large number of fans in this step. The ultimate goal of the wanghong economy is to transfer Internet celebrity awareness into revenue. Therefore, the more loyal fans of internet celebrities, the higher the income they may create. After the internet celebrities were born and amassed fans, the marketing strategy focused on protecting the public image of celebrities on the Internet, avoiding out of fashion and preventing the loss of fans.

Digital marketing methods 
The media of digital marketing can be mainly divided into social networks, video websites, search engines, news portals and e-commerce websites. For social network websites like Facebook, Twitter, Instagram and Weibo, the Internet celebrity runner could cooperate with the site to push their content to the target audience. As for the search engines, for instance, Google, Bing and Baidu. Internet celebrities can place advertisements on search engines to make the star appear in related searches or rank the celebrity higher. Other video websites, media like YouTube and electronic business platforms like Taobao are also important ways to market Internet celebrities. The advertising revenue of the video website and the sales from the online shop at the e-commerce store are the primary revenue of Internet celebrities. They can spend money to promote their videos or stores on the website's homepage to attract more audiences.

Moreover, the Internet celebrity is a type of self-media. They are a high-quality communication channel. They can spread not only their fans, but fans are also carriers of self-propagating effects. If the Internet celebrity company runs some Internet celebrities, they can recommend each other's content to their fans. This method is an efficient and low-cost marketing method.

Global context

Digital 
A report from the China Internet Network Information Center showed that in 2015, Chinese people spent 3.75 hours online daily. By June 2014, there were 632 million Internet users in the country and a penetration rate of 46.9%.

The rapid uptake of smart devices in China is critical because it lays the foundation for developing the digital consumer market. There were 80 million smartphones in circulation in China in 2010, which skyrocketed to 580 million units in 2013 and is expected to increase further to over 1 billion units by 2016. There are 650 million mobile internet users, 350 million smartphone subscribers and 290 million active WeChat users.

The internet is also creating new markets for products and service offerings that may not have existed even a few short years ago. E-commerce is fundamentally reshaping the retail sector and leading to greater consumption. Digitalization has created a new generation of Chinese consumers. These emerging consumers have more sophisticated consumption habits than Chinese consumers ever had in the past. To be successful, enterprises need to understand their customers and offer a distinctive experience to them. Understanding customers requires getting valuable, actionable insights about them.

Young people consumption 
The Post-90s people of China depend on smartphones, appreciate the diversity of tastes, rely highly on social media, and are keen online shoppers. They pursue young fashion, are self-centred, are rational consumers, desire novelty, thirst for knowledge, try to outdo others, and are impatient. They have stronger consumption desires and excessive spending consciousness. They prefer new advertising methods over traditional marketing.

In the Post-90s, wanghong was perceived to be more authentic and less distant by them compared to conventional celebrities. Overwhelmed by the variety of products available, wanghong act as key Opinion Leaders in their unique fields. Through making videos on makeup and fashion and giving valuable tips and advice, wanghong plays an essential role in the purchasing process and acts more like a trustworthy advisory.

Chinese consumer culture

Political: Chinese Censorship 
The apparatus of China's internet Control is considered more extensive and advanced than in any other country. The governmental authorities not only block website content but also monitor the internet access of individuals. "Although improvements have been made in certain areas of civil rights in China, individuals' speech rights, especially political speech rights, are limited. In its characteristically sweeping language, the Chinese internet white paper states that the Chinese government forbids internet content: against the cardinal principles outlined in the Constitution, endangering state security, divulging state secrets, subverting state power and jeopardizing national unification; damaging state honour and interests; instigating ethnic hatred or discrimination and jeopardizing ethnic unity; jeopardizing state religious policy, propagating heretical or superstitious ideas; spreading rumours, disrupting social order and stability; disseminating obscenity, pornography, gambling, violence, brutality and terror or abetting crime; humiliating or slandering others, trespassing on the lawful rights and interests of others; and other contents forbidden by laws and administrative regulations". This has caused Chinese celebrities online to focus on topics such as lifestyles or fashion, unlike some famous online celebrities in the west who make satire or talk about political and social issues.

Demographics: Chinese Large Consumption 
Chinese people escalating demand for consumption, increasing demand for consumption comes from two major factors in China. One is the absolute increase in the size of the population, and the other is the expanded economy and higher disposable income. An average GDP per capita rose at over 9.8 per cent annually for the past 30 consecutive years, thus enabling China to become the second largest economy in the world in 2010. As China’s living standards are rising with economic growth, Chinese consumers’ shopping habits have changed, and more and more consumers are able and willing to spend more on goods and services.

Wanghong online shops have low prices and fashion features, which meet Chinese consumer psychology and mass consumption. With the potential of more than 1.3 billion consumers, China’s domestic market presents enormous buying power.

Culture

Chinese collective nature 
There are some characteristics of Chinese culture that influence its consumption and could explain the perception of internet celebrities; according to that, cultural values are considered determinants of attitudes and behaviours: The first feature of Chinese society is the collective nature. The Chinese will adhere more easily to the group's standards than people in individualistic societies. The second feature is polychronic. The people in a polychronic culture enjoy social harmony and generally emphasise relationships more than tasks. According to the research cited, "online social interaction is important in a collectivistic culture such as China. Culture may be the strongest determinant factor of differences in customer online social networking and online shopping behaviour across cultures (Pookulangara and Koesler, 2011 Brandtzaeg, 2010). People holding these cultural values generally rely more on word-of-mouth from friends, family and expert opinions. They are more likely to communicate and share information on social media. They also tend to find experts to earn leading opinion advice for important decision-making and emotional support (Ji et al., 2010)". These characteristics force the role of opinion leaders who have a significant number of followers (like celebrities online) and who may influence a brand.

Symbolic Value 
Symbolic consumption has become a significant trend driven by young consumers. Products are viewed as possessing meaning beyond their tangible presence. In another way, consumers view products as symbols and imbue them with attributes beyond their immediate physical nature. Therefore, consumers buy products not only for functional benefits but also for a specific meaning and additional potential pleasure. Through the consumption process, consumers find individual self-identities. This consuming behaviour also becomes a symbolic activity.

If the consumer has choices, they will consume things with particular symbolic meanings. For example, using recycled envelopes may symbolize care for the environment, attending classical concerts may convey the fine taste, supporting gay rights may signify open-mindedness, and so on.

In social media, wanghong structured the tags of “fashion/chic/individuality/entertainment/beautiful “as the personal identification system, coding them in various literal text/audio/video ways. Netizens decode those symbolic activities in consuming according to their preference. Therefore, consumers not only purchase the goods but also get psychological pleasure. For instance, some consumers get visual pleasure. They see the pretty face of Wanghong, and some get auditory pleasure because they listen to the Wanghong’s singing.

Future and Concern 
According to Venture Capitalist Mary Meeker's annual internet trends report, the upgrading of the internet trend is speeding up, and millennials' consciousness as consumers is rising. This makes sense that the content is the most valuable part of a wanghong to increase the network traffic, and this is also how wanghong differs from the traditional celebrity: wanghong's primary value is their content, while the conventional celebrity's value is mostly themselves so that the traditional ones can speak for a product getting rid of the content, but wanghong can't. To attract followers' attention, some wanghong use vulgar, mammonish, sexually violent content, challenging the bottom line of morality in society and negatively influencing the younger people's attitude towards consumption. To deal with this problem, at the end of 2016, the Chinese Ministry of Culture released the "Measures for the Administration of Online Performance Operating Activities" to regulate market order and promote the healthy and orderly development of the online performance industry. Besides, regarding the output of content, wanghong needs more sustained motivation. If they keep innovating their content and coming out with new fresh ideas, they will retain their value and continue attracting followers.

According to McKinsey's report about Chinese consumer trends published in 2016, even though China's economic growth is slowing down and consumer confidence is trending down, the Chinese consumer market is still expanding. China is in the process of transforming into a consumer society. Consumers are shifting "from products to services and from mass to premium segments", and more and more of them are starting to "seek a more balanced lifestyle where experiences take priority", along with the development of new technology like Alibaba's virtual reality, Wanghong is also transforming from the role of salesmen to that of a substitute user, providing their direct, authentic experience of products to their followers.

External links 
 Papi Jiang's popular video "http://v.youku.com/v_show/id_XMTU4Mjc3NTk3Ng==.html?from=s1.8-1-1.2&spm=a2h0k.8191407.0.0" at Youku.
 Celebrity economy set for explosive growth in China "http://www.ecns.cn/business/2016/03-16/203077.shtml" at ECNS.
 Symbolic consumption "http://catalog.flatworldknowledge.com/bookhub/reader/8111?e=sirgy_1_0-ch03_s01 at Flat World Education.
 Virtual Retail-ity "https://news.vice.com/story/alibaba-vr-shopping-buy-singles-day" at Vice news.

References 

Digital marketing
Advertising in China
Promotion and marketing communications
E-commerce in China